Beth Bauer Grace (born March 15, 1980) is an American former professional golfer.

Bauer was born in Largo, Florida. As an amateur, she won the 1997 U.S. Girls' Junior and in 1998 and 1999 she earned back-to-back victories at the North and South Women's Amateur at Pinehurst Resort in North Carolina. She played on the victorious  U.S. Curtis Cup team in 1998 and 2000.

A former student at Duke University, where she played on the golf team, she turned professional in 2000. At Duke, she was named the Atlantic Coast Conference (ACC) Rookie of the Year in 1999, an honor that was later awarded to fellow Blue Devils Liz Janangelo (2003), Brittany Lang (2004), Amanda Blumenherst (2006), and Laetitia Beck.

She won the player and rookie of the year awards on the second tier Futures Tour in 2001 as she graduated to the LPGA Tour for 2002. She enjoyed further success in her first season on the main tour, finishing in 18th place on the money list and winning the rookie of the year award ahead of Natalie Gulbis. Her performances fell away over the following seasons, and she lost her place on the LPGA Tour at the end of the 2006 season. She quit playing professional golf at the end of 2007.

In March 2008, she met Andy Grace while working at the Heritage Harbor Golf and Country Club while finishing her college degree.  They married in November 2010.  As of April 2011, she was student-teaching in an elementary school in Florida.  On December 20, 2011, she gave birth to a girl and after being the director of golf at Cypress Run Golf Club for over 5 years, her family has relocated to Birmingham, Alabama where she still enjoys playing and teaching the game.

Professional wins (4)

Futures Tour wins (4)
2001 California FUTURES Classic, Colorado Women's FUTURES Classic, Aurora Health Care SBC FUTURES Charity Golf Classic, York Newspaper Company FUTURES Classic

Results in LPGA majors

^The Women's British Open replaced the du Maurier Classic as an LPGA major in 2001.

LA = Low amateur
CUT = missed the half-way cut
"T" tied

References

External links

American female golfers
Duke Blue Devils women's golfers
LPGA Tour golfers
Golfers from Florida
People from Largo, Florida
1980 births
Living people